Lindsay Elizabeth Buziak (November 2, 1983 – February 2, 2008) was a Canadian real estate agent who was murdered on a property viewing in Saanich, a suburb of Victoria, British Columbia, on February 2, 2008 after being lured to meet a couple (a man and a woman) posing as prospective clients. They had told her they were looking for a million dollar home. Buziak was apprehensive about going to the viewing because of the odd way someone with her low profile had been contacted directly for such a large deal. However she went despite her misgivings after being reassured. The sophisticated and pre-planned setting up of her homicide is believed to indicate she was personally targeted by experienced criminals with inside information. The main theories as to motive are she was believed to be a potential informant after seeing something she was not intended to, or there was some personal reason. Buziak was not involved in criminal activity, but had friends from a wide range of backgrounds.

Background and events leading up to the murder 

Lindsay Elizabeth Buziak was born on November 2, 1983, to Jeff Buziak and Evelyn Buziak (née Reitmayer). She had one sister, Sara. In 2008, 24-year-old Lindsay Buziak was an ambitious Victoria real estate agent who had made a promising start to her career and was described by her family, friends, and colleagues as being popular and caring. Her boyfriend, Jason Zailo, is part of a prominent and wealthy family that owns a successful real estate business.

In late January 2008, Buziak received a call from a woman who told Buziak that she and her husband were looking urgently for a home to buy, with a budget of $1 million. The caller had a foreign accent and used what later turned out to be a fake name. Unnerved by the nature of the call, Buziak asked the caller how she had gotten her personal cell phone number, as she was a relatively junior employee. The caller said that a previous client of Buziak's had passed it on to her.

Buziak told her boyfriend, Jason Zailo, and her father, Jeff Buziak, about the call and revealed her concerns. Zailo encouraged Buziak to take on the client because of the high commission she would get from the sale, and to reassure her, Zailo offered to be outside the property in his car in case anything went wrong. Buziak found a suitable property and made an appointment with the client to view it at 5:30 p.m. on Saturday, February 2, 2008.

Day of the murder 

On Saturday, February 2, 2008, Buziak and Zailo ate a late lunch at a restaurant, paying the bill at 4:24 p.m. They left separately in their own vehicles. It is believed that Buziak went home to change clothes before the viewing. Zailo traveled to an auto shop to pick up a colleague. Zailo was running late, and CCTV at the auto shop showed him and his colleague leaving at 5:30 p.m. Zailo and Buziak had exchanged several text messages and Buziak was aware that Zailo would be late.

The street on which the house is located, De Sousa Place, is a small cul-de-sac containing four houses. Number 1702 is at the outer end of the cul-de-sac, on the intersection of De Sousa Place and a main thoroughfare, Torquay Drive. The side of the property and the fence of the back garden run parallel to Torquay Drive.

Despite the client telling Buziak that she would come alone, a couple turned up for the viewing. At 5:30 p.m., two witnesses saw a 6-foot-tall Caucasian man with dark hair and a blonde-haired woman aged between 35 and 45 wearing a distinctively patterned dress walking up the cul-de-sac. The witnesses then saw Lindsay shake hands with the couple, and from the body language of their greeting it appeared that she had never met them before. The three of them then entered the house.

Zailo and his colleague arrived at the cul-de-sac at about 5:40 p.m. As they were driving up to the property, Zailo saw a figure through the glass of the front door.

Zailo parked outside the property for about 10 minutes. He then decided to drive back out to Torquay Drive and park there, as he did not want to be "a nosey, interfering boyfriend". After waiting another 10 minutes parked on Torquay Drive, Zailo texted Buziak to ask if she was okay. Buziak never opened this message.

After twenty minutes had passed since Zailo had arrived and seen the couple go back into the house, Zailo went to the front door and found it locked when he tried to open it. Through the mottled glass on the front door, he saw Buziak's shoes in the entrance hall, but there was no sign of movement and no one answered his repeated knocks at the door. At this point, he called 911. While Zailo was on the line with the operator, his colleague found a gap in the fence in the back garden, entered the garden and saw that the back patio door was wide open. He called out to Zailo, who told the operator that they were going into the house. Zailo then hung up.

Zailo's colleague came through the main level of the home to unlock the front door to let Zailo in. Zailo immediately ran upstairs and found Buziak lying in a pool of blood in the master bedroom. Zailo called 911 a second time and the emergency services arrived soon after.

Buziak was pronounced dead when the paramedics arrived. She had been stabbed multiple times. There were no defensive wounds, indicating that she had probably been initially stabbed from behind and had no inkling of what was about to happen. None of Buziak's possessions had been stolen and she had not been sexually assaulted.

Investigation 

Zailo and his colleague were taken into custody but were released without charge after their version of events was verified and the timestamped surveillance footage from the auto shop proved that they could not have committed the murder. According to the Saanich Police Department, Zailo has been interviewed several times over the years and has always cooperated with the police. He has also passed a polygraph test.

Due to the complete lack of DNA, fingerprints or any other physical evidence at the scene, it is believed that the murder was well-organized and carried out by people who had perhaps killed before. The police are satisfied that the killers were leaving through the front door when Zailo drove up to the property, and that they then fled through the back door, leaving the back patio door open and passing through the fence and back to a vehicle, which was presumably parked somewhere on or near Torquay Drive. This is consistent with the witness statements of the unknown couple walking (rather than driving) up the cul-de-sac, and the fact that all the vehicles on the cul-de-sac once the police arrived were accounted for.

The cell phone used by the unknown woman to call Buziak was purchased in Vancouver several months before the murder and had never been used until that call was made. It was activated under the name of Paulo Rodriguez, which authorities believe is a fake name. It was registered to a legitimate address in Vancouver, which is a business address, but it is believed that the business has no connection with the case and that its address was simply chosen at random. The phone was deactivated soon after the murder and has not been used since. Cell phone tower "pings" show that the phone travelled on the ferry from Vancouver the day before the murder. Authorities believe the phone was used for the sole purpose of the murder and was discarded afterwards. This supports their theory that the murder was planned.

The family of Jason Zailo were investigated due to their connections with the cul-de-sac. De Sousa Court is named after developer Joe De Sousa, a friend and business associate of Shirley Zailo, Jason's mother. Part of the cul-de-sac was still under construction at the time of the murder, and De Sousa himself was at the location an hour before the murder, supervising the construction work. However, the police have stated that no one in the Zailo family is a suspect.

In September 2010, the American network NBC aired a Dateline episode, "Dream House Murder". The Saanich Police Detectives, Horsley and McColl revealed that in December 2007, about 8 weeks prior to her murder, Buziak tried to contact the friend of her ex-boyfriend while on a visit to Calgary. On January 22, 2008, the largest drug bust in Alberta's history took place and the friend was arrested as being a major participant in the illegal drug trafficking operation. It was speculated that Buziak's murder may have been ordered by a drug cartel because she was believed to be a police informant. The detectives investigated the possibility but quickly ruled it out as a motive because she was not an informant and the personal nature of her murder did not fit a hired killer's method of operation. Crime scene investigator Yolanda McClary and veteran Homicide Detective Dwayne Stanton both agree that Buziak's murder was not a contracted murder related to a drug cartel; it was brutal but too amateurish. Both seasoned investigators stated that they do believe that Buziak's murder was very personal and planned by someone very close to her; someone who had access to inside information from the Re/Max office where she worked.  
     
Speculation regarding another drug bust related to this group of people was also investigated as a link to Buziak's murder. An individual's phone had been tapped because of his high level of involvement in the trafficking and sale of illegal narcotics in British Columbia and Alberta. During the wiretaps, law enforcement uncovered information that led to the BC Legislature Raids in 2003. Buziak's and her boyfriend's phones at the time were also tapped because of his association with this group. Although this theory was interesting, it was quickly dismissed because Buziak was never known to be involved in drug use or trafficking and was not on the witness list released to the defense during the trial.

Later events 

Later in 2008, a close friend of Buziak's, called Nikki, claimed that she was awakened by a telephone call in the middle of the night from an unknown number. As she was half-asleep, she did not register much of what the female caller was saying, but she noticed that the caller had a strange accent that she could not place. She became scared when she remembered that Buziak had reported that her unidentified client (and possible murderer) had an odd accent that she could not put her finger on, and which she thought may have been fake. Now fully alert, she called the number back but no one picked up. She called repeatedly, "20 or 30 times," until someone answered. The person on the other end of the line was Shirley Zailo. Nikki asked Shirley why she called her and how she had her number, as they did not know each other. Shirley replied that she meant to call another Nikki, her secretary, and that she didn't know why this Nikki's number was in her contact list but presumed that her son Jason Zailo must have added it. Shirley Zailo categorically denies that this event occurred, and it has not been publicly revealed whether Nikki's claim was followed up by the authorities.

In February of each year, Buziak's father Jeff leads an annual walk in remembrance of Buziak and to keep her case in the public eye.

In August 2017, a public message board comment was posted on the investigative website run by Jeff Buziak. The message, which contained misspellings throughout, stated: "I killed Lindsey [sic] and stupid cops will never prove it."

In 2020, the Capital Daily requested a release of public records relating to the case, and reported previously unpublished information. The documents revealed that police were aware of two different "crime phones" used by the suspects; one with a Vancouver number only used to contact Buziak, and another used to check the voicemail of the first. They also reported strange Internet activity during the time just before her murder, and that police initially suspected that "violent criminals" on her Facebook friends list "may have played a role" in the murder.

In February 2021, Saanich police said that advancements in DNA analysis and other technology had created new leads in the case. The United States Federal Bureau of Investigation has been working with investigators on the case since early 2020.

See also 

 List of unsolved murders in Canada
List of unsolved murders (21st century)
 Suzy Lamplugh, a British estate agent who disappeared during a scheduled property viewing in London. No trace of Lamplugh was ever found and the identity of the client viewing the property remains unknown.

References

External links 

 Casefile True Crime Podcast - Case 28: Lindsay Buziak - 6 August 2016

2008 murders in Canada
2008 in British Columbia
Deaths by person in Canada
Deaths by stabbing in Canada
February 2008 crimes
February 2008 events in Canada
Saanich, British Columbia
Unsolved murders in Canada
Murder in British Columbia
Women in British Columbia